Bayou Township is a township in Ashley County, Arkansas, United States. Its total population was 55 as of the 2010 United States Census, a decrease of 5.17 percent from 58 at the 2000 census.

According to the 2010 Census, Bayou Township is located at  (33.349358, -91.586808).

References

External links 

Townships in Arkansas
Townships in Ashley County, Arkansas
Arkansas placenames of Native American origin